The German Navy is the navy of Germany and part of the unified Bundeswehr (Federal Defense), the German Armed Forces. The German Navy was originally known as the Bundesmarine (Federal Navy) from 1956 to 1995, when Deutsche Marine (German Navy) became the official name with respect to the 1990 incorporation of the East German Volksmarine (People's Navy). It is deeply integrated into the NATO alliance. Its primary mission is protection of Germany's territorial waters and maritime infrastructure as well as sea lines of communication. Apart from this, the German Navy participates in peacekeeping operations, and renders humanitarian assistance and disaster relief. It also participates in anti-piracy operations.

History

The German Navy traces its roots back to the Reichsflotte (Imperial Fleet) of the revolutionary era of 1848–52. The Reichsflotte was the first German navy to sail under the black-red-gold flag. Founded on 14 June 1848 by the orders of the democratically elected Frankfurt Parliament, the Reichsflotte's brief existence ended with the failure of the revolution and it was disbanded on 2 April 1852; thus, the modern day navy celebrates its birthday on 14 June.

Between May 1945 and 1956, the German Mine Sweeping Administration and its successor organizations, made up of former members of Nazi Germany's Kriegsmarine (War Navy), became something of a transition stage for the navy, allowing the future Marine to draw on recently experienced personnel upon its formation. Also, from 1949 to 1952 the US Navy had maintained the Naval Historical Team in Bremerhaven. This group of former Kriegsmarine officers acting as historical and tactical consultants to the Americans, was significant in establishing a German element in the NATO senior naval staff. In 1956, with West Germany's accession to NATO, the Bundesmarine (Federal Navy), as the navy was known colloquially, was formally established. In the same year the East German Volkspolizei See (literally People's Police Sea) became the Volksmarine (People's Navy). During the Cold War all of the German Navy's combat vessels were assigned to NATO's Allied Forces Baltic Approaches's naval command NAVBALTAP.

With the accession of East Germany to the Federal Republic of Germany in 1990 the Volksmarine along with the whole National People's Army became part of the Bundeswehr. Since 1995 the name German Navy is used in international context, while the official name since 1956 remains Marine without any additions. As of April 2020, the strength of the navy is 16,704 men and women.

A number of naval forces have operated in different periods. See
 Preußische Marine (Prussian Navy), 1701–1867
Reichsflotte (Fleet of the Realm), 1848–52
 North German Federal Navy, 1867–71
 Imperial German Navy (Kaiserliche Marine), 1871–1919
Reichsmarine, 1919–35
Kriegsmarine, 1935–45
 German Mine Sweeping Administration, 1945–48
Volksmarine, the navy of East Germany (GDR) 1956–90
 Marine, 1956–present (Bundesmarine, colloquially)

Current operations
German warships permanently participate in all four NATO Maritime Groups. The German Navy is also engaged in operations against international terrorism such as Operation Enduring Freedom and NATO Operation Active Endeavour.

Presently the largest operation the German Navy is participating in is UNIFIL off the coast of Lebanon. The German contribution to this operation is two frigates, four fast attack craft, and two auxiliary vessels. The naval component of UNIFIL has been under German command.

The navy is operating a number of development and testing installations as part of an inter-service and international network. Among these is the Centre of Excellence for Operations in Confined and Shallow Waters (COE CSW), an affiliated centre of Allied Command Transformation. The COE CSW was established in April 2007 and officially accredited by NATO on 26 May 2009. It is co-located with the staff of the German Flotilla 1 in Kiel whose Commander is double-hatted as Director, COE CSW.

Equipment

Ships and submarines

In total, there are about 65 commissioned ships in the German Navy, including; 11 frigates, 5 corvettes, 2 minesweepers, 10 minehunters, 6 submarines, 11 replenishment ships and 20 miscellaneous auxiliary vessels. The displacement of the navy is 220,000 tonnes.

Ships of the German Navy include:

 4 Baden-Württemberg-class frigates F125 (all delivered by January 2022)
 3 Sachsen-class frigates F124
 4 Brandenburg-class frigates F123
 5 K130 Braunschweig class corvettes (5 additional units in production, planned commissioning from  2025)
 6 Type 212 submarines

In addition, the German Navy and the Royal Danish Navy are in cooperation in the "Ark Project". This agreement made the Ark Project responsible for the strategic sealift of German armed forces where the full-time charter of three roll-on-roll-off cargo and troop ships are ready for deployments. In addition, these ships are also kept available for the use of the other European NATO countries. The three vessels have a combined displacement of 60,000 tonnes.
Including these ships, the total ships' displacement available to the Deutsche Marine is 280,000 tonnes.

Procurement of Joint Support Ships (either two JSS800 for an amphibious group of 800 soldiers, or three smaller JSS400), was planned during the 1995–2010 period but the programme appears now to have been abandoned, not having been mentioned in two recent defence reviews. The larger ships would have been tasked for strategic troop transport and amphibious operations, and were to displace 27,000 to 30,000 tons for 800 soldiers.

Aircraft

The naval air arm of the German Navy is called the Marinefliegerkommando. The Marinefliegerkommando operates 56 aircraft, in May 2021 it was announced that the German Navy intended to replace the P-3C aircraft with 5 Boeing P-8 Poseidon MPA aircraft through a FMS agreement from 2025 onwards.

|-
|Lockheed P-3C Orion – CUP
|United States
|
|MPA
|2006
|4
| 
|Former Royal Netherlands Navy, will be replaced in 2025 by 5 Boeing P-8 Poseidon
|-
|Boeing P-8 Poseidon
|United States
|
|MPA
| 
|
|
|5 on order, entry into service 2025. 
|-
|Dornier 228
|Germany
|
|Pollution control
|1996
|2
|
| 
|-
|NH90 Sea Lion
|Germany
|Rotorcraft
|SAR/transport
|2018
|13
|
|Total of 18 on order, replacing the Westland Sea King
|-
|NH90 Sea Tiger
|Germany
|Rotorcraft
|ASW
|2025
| 
|
| Total of 31 on order, replacing Westland Lynx
|-
| Westland Lynx Mk.88
| UK
| Rotorcraft
| ASW
| 1981
| 21
|
|Will be replaced by the NH90 Sea Tiger
|- 
|Westland Sea King Mk.41
|UK
|Rotorcraft
|SAR/transport
|1975
|14
| 
|Being replaced by the NH90 Sea Lion
|-
|Sea Falcon
|Sweden
|UAV
|ISR
| 
|
|2
|Used as testbed for future UAVs on the corvettes, 8 more planned
|-
|Puma AE II
|United States
|UAV
|ISR
|2019 
|6
|
|3 systems with 6 UAVs, dubbed "LARUS" in the German Navy 
|-
|DJI Phantom 4
|China
|Micro UAV
|ISR
|2017 
|5
|
|
|}

Structure
The German Navy is commanded by the Inspector of the Navy (Inspekteur der Marine) supported by the Navy Command (Marinekommando) in Rostock.

Formations
 Navy Command, Rostock
Einsatzflottille 1 (HQ Kiel)

1st Corvette Squadron (1. Korvettengeschwader), Warnemünde
1st Submarine Squadron, Eckernförde
Submarine Training Centre (Ausbildungszentrum Unterseeboote), Eckernförde
3rd Minesweeping Squadron (3. Minensuchgeschwader), Kiel
Sea Battalion, Eckernförde
Kommando Spezialkräfte Marine, Eckernförde
Naval Base Command Kiel (Marinestützpunktkommando Kiel)
Naval Base Command Eckernförde
Naval Base Command Warnemünde
Einsatzflottille 2, Wilhelmshaven
HQ 2nd Flotilla
2nd Frigate Squadron (2. Fregattengeschwader), Wilhelmshaven
4th Frigate Squadron (4. Fregattengeschwader), Wilhelmshaven
Auxiliary Squadron (Trossgeschwader), Wilhelmshaven
Naval Base Command Wilhelmshaven
Naval Aviation Command, Nordholz
Naval Air Wing 3 (Marinefliegergeschwader 3), Nordholz
Naval Air Wing 5 (Marinefliegergeschwader 5), Nordholz
Naval Support Command ( — MUKdo)
Naval Medical Institute, Kiel

Naval Academy, Flensburg
Naval Petty Officer School, Plön
Naval Engineering School, Parow, near Stralsund
Naval Operations School, Bremerhaven
Naval Damage Control Training Centre, Neustadt in Holstein

Ranks

Officers

Petty officers and enlisted seamen

Radio and communication stations
 DHO38
 DHJ58
 DHJ59

Future developments
 The German government has announced the selection in January 2020 and contracting in June 2020 of Damen Group as the main contractor, together with partners Blohm+Voss and Thales, for supplying four Multi-Purpose Combat Ship MKS 180 frigates (Mehrzweckkampfschiff 180) to the German Navy with an option for 2 additional ships. The ships will be built at Blohm + Voss shipyard in Hamburg and at other shipyard locations of the North German Lürssen Group.
 Two further-developed Type 212 submarines with significant advancements (Common Design) will be designed & procured with Norway in the next decade. The contract was signed in July 2021, where according to the official statement the "NDMA and its German counterparts in the Bundesamt für Ausrüstung, Informationstechnik und Nutzung der Bundeswehr (BAAINBw) will acquire six new submarines – four Norwegian and two German – as well as Naval Strike Missiles for use on both German and Norwegian naval vessels." According to ThyssenKrupp Marine Systems the delivery of the two boats for the German Navy is scheduled for 2032 and 2034.
 Five additional Braunschweig class corvettes are ordered and will be delivered 2020–2023.
 NH90 NFH 'Sea Tiger' Helicopters ordered to replace Lynx in ASW/AsuW role, originally ordered by the German Army as NH90 TTH variant with deliveries planned from 2025 onwards. Up to 31 could be ordered.
 18 NH90 MRH 'Sealion' Helicopters are unarmed and will replace the current 21 Sea King helicopters of Naval Air Wing 5 in SAR and ship-based Transport Role (VertRep) with deliveries planned from 2019 onwards.
 The Saab Skeldar has been ordered as a testbed for a future maritime UAV for the Braunschweig class corvette.
 Integration of the German Navy Marines (Seebatallion) in the Netherlands Marine Corps and use of the Amphibious ships of the Royal Netherlands Navy such as the Joint Support Ship HNLMS Karel Doorman (A833) as of 2016.
 In June 2020 it was announced that German Navy and Royal Netherlands Navy will cooperate and plan the future replacement of both the Sachsen-class frigate and De Zeven Provinciën-class frigate from 2030 onwards.

See also

 List of ship classes of the Bundesmarine and Deutsche Marine
 List of ships of the German navies
 List of admirals of the German Navy
 German commando frogmen
Marineamt
Marine-Regatta-Verein
 U-boat
Volksmarine

References

Further reading 
 Jan Wiedemann: COE CSW celebrates fifth anniversary; in: NAVAL FORCES III/2014 p. 90 f.
 Hans-Joachim Stricker: Centre of Excellence for Operations in Confined and Shallow Waters COE CSW – Das COE als Ausdruck unserer besonderen nationalen Fähigkeiten im Bündnis; in: Marineforum 6-2007 p. 3 f.
 Fritz-Rudolf Weber: Centre of Excellence for Operations in Confined and Shallow Waters – Think Tank für die NATO; in: Marineforum 1/2-2010 p. 11 ff.
 Hans Georg Buss, Stefan Riewesell: Maritime C-IED and Harbour Protection: A Joint Effort; in: The Transformer Fall 2013 Vol 9 Issue 2 p. 18
 Rahn, Werner. "German Navies from 1848 to 2016: Their Development and Courses from Confrontation to Cooperation." Naval War College Review 70.4 (2017). online
 Peifer, Douglas (2002). The Three German Navies:  Dissolution, Transition, and New Beginning. Gainesville: University Press of Florida, 2002. ISBN 0-8130-2553-2
 Peifer, Douglas (2011).·“Establishing the Bundesmarine.” In Rearming Germany, ed. James S. Corum. Boston; Leiden: Brill, 2011. ISBN 978-90-04-20320

External links

 
 The German Navy — Facts and Figures, 12th Edition, February 2013
 Uniforms

 
Bundeswehr
Navies by country